Decomposition in computer science, also known as factoring, is breaking a complex problem or system into parts that are easier to conceive, understand, program, and maintain.

Overview 
There are different types of decomposition defined in computer sciences:

 In structured programming, algorithmic decomposition breaks a process down into well-defined steps.
 Structured analysis breaks down a software system from the system context level to system functions and data entities as described by Tom DeMarco.<ref>Tom DeMarco (1978). Structured Analysis and System Specification. New York, NY: Yourdon, 1978. , .</ref>
 Object-oriented decomposition, on the other hand, breaks a large system down into progressively smaller classes or objects that are responsible for some part of the problem domain.
 According to Booch, algorithmic decomposition is a necessary part of object-oriented analysis and design, but object-oriented systems start with and emphasize decomposition into objects.

More generally, functional decomposition in computer science is a technique for mastering the complexity of the function of a model. A functional model of a system is thereby replaced by a series of functional models of subsystems.

 Decomposition topics 
 Decomposition paradigm 
A decomposition  paradigm in computer programming is a strategy for organizing a program as a number of parts, and it usually implies a specific way to organize a program text. Usually the aim of using a decomposition paradigm is to optimize some metric related to program complexity, for example the modularity of the program or its maintainability.

Most decomposition paradigms suggest breaking down a program into parts so as to minimize the static dependencies among those parts, and to maximize the cohesiveness of each part. Some popular decomposition paradigms are the procedural, modules, abstract data type and object oriented ones.

The concept of decomposition paradigm is entirely independent and different from that of model of computation, but the two are often confused, most often in the cases of the functional model of computation being confused with procedural decomposition, and of the actor model of computation being confused with object oriented decomposition.

 Decomposition diagram 

A decomposition diagram shows a complex, process, organization, data subject area, or other type of object broken down into lower level, more detailed components. For example, decomposition diagrams may represent organizational structure or functional decomposition into processes. Decomposition diagrams  provide a logical hierarchical decomposition of a system.

See also
 Code refactoring
 Component-based software engineering
 Dynamization
 Duplicate code
 Event partitioning
 How to Solve It''
 Integrated Enterprise Modeling
 Personal information management
 Readability
 Subroutine

References

External links

 Object Oriented Analysis and Design
 On the Criteria To Be Used in Decomposing Systems into Modules

Software design
Decomposition methods